This is a list of people and other topics appearing on the cover of Time magazine in the 1930s. Time was first published in 1923. As Time became established as one of the United States' leading news magazines, an appearance on the cover of Time became an indicator of notability, fame or notoriety. Such features were accompanied by articles about the topic.

For other decades, see Lists of covers of Time magazine.

1930

 January 6 –  Owen D. Young
 January 13 –  Domingo Ugalde
 January 20 –  André Tardieu
 January 27 –  William D. Mitchell
 February 3 –  Maria Montessori
 February 10 –  Ray Lyman Wilbur
 February 17 –  Charles Evans Hughes
 February 24 –   Cyrus S. Eaton
 March 3 – Pointer Mary Blue
 March 10 –  Royal Cortissoz
 March 17 –  Queen Mary
 March 24 –  Al Capone
 March 31 –  Mahatma Gandhi
 April 7 –  Heber Jedediah Grant
 April 14 –  William H. Welch
 April 21 –  Philip Snowden
 April 28 –   Leopold Stokowski
 May 5 –  Julius H. Barnes
 May 12 –   Alois Lang
 May 19 –  Yen Hsi-shan
 May 26 –  Edward G.V. Stanley
 June 2 –  William Adams Delano
 June 9 –  Joseph Stalin
 June 16 –  William C. Procter
 June 23 –  Julio Prestes
 June 30 –  Lucrezia Bori
 July 7 –  Louis D. Brandeis
 July 14 –  Herbert Hoover Jr.
 July 21 –  David A. Reed
 July 28 –  Richard B. Bennett
 August 4 –  Alexander Legge
 August 11 –  Lady Elizabeth Bowes-Lyon, Duchess of York
 August 18 –  Mrs. Thomas Hitchcock (Louise Eustis Hitchcock)
 August 26 –  Wilbert Robinson
 September 1 –  Lord Dawson
 September 8 –  Augusto B. Leguía
 September 15 –  Harold S. Vanderbilt
 September 22 –  Bobby Jones
 September 29 –  Dwight W. Morrow
 October 6 –  Harry Emerson Fosdick
 October 13 –   Sergei Koussevitsky
 October 20 –  Henri Matisse
 October 27 –  King George V &  Queen Mary
 November 3 –  Haile Selassie
 November 10 –  Jouett Shouse
 November 17 – Football's Public
 November 24 –  Robert Bulkley
 December 1 –   James J. Davis
 December 8 –   King Haakon VII
 December 15 –   Mary Garden
 December 22 –  Elsa Einstein
 December 29 –   Pius XI

1931

 January 5 –  Mahatma Gandhi
 January 12 –  James Ewing
 January 19 –  Gerardo Machado
 January 26 –  William Borah
 February 2 –  George Wickersham
 February 9 –  Charlie Chaplin
 February 16 –  Joseph Deems Taylor aka Deems Taylor
 February 23 –   Vyacheslav Menzhinsky
 March 2 –  David S. Ingalls
 March 9 –  Charles R. Crane
 March 16 –  Oswald Mosley
 March 23 –  John F. Curry
 March 30 –  Walter Lippman
 April 6 –  King Alfonso XIII
 April 13 –  Roy W. Howard
 April 20 –  King Prajadhipok
 April 27 –  Mrs. Nanaline Duke
 May 4 –  Niceto Alcalá-Zamora
 May 11 –  Hubert Lyautey
 May 18 –  Kenkichi Kagami
 May 25 –  Walter Coffey,  John Humber &  Grace Hammond Conners
 June 1 –  Samuel R. McKelvie
 June 8 –  David Starr Jordan
 June 15 –  Heinrich Brüning
 June 22 –  Morton Downey
 June 29 –  Cyril Alington
 July 6 –  Betty Nuthall
 July 13 –  Ogden L. Mills
 July 20 –  Nikola Tesla
 July 27 –  Paul Von Hindenburg
 August 3 –  Willa Cather
 August 10 –  Paul W. Litchfield
 August 17 –  Samuel Seabury
 August 24 –  Albert H. Wiggin
 August 31 –  Winthrop W. Aldrich
 September 7 –  Ramsay MacDonald,  Stanley Baldwin &  David Lloyd George
 September 14 –  Patrick Jay Hurley
 September 21 –  Ross S. Sterling
 September 28 –  Pierre Laval &  Aristide Briand
 October 5 –  Primo Carnera
 October 12 –  Baron Kijuro Shidehara
 October 19 –  William Green
 October 26 –  Chiang Kai-shek &  Mme. Chiang
 November 2 –  Eugene O'Neill
 November 9 –  Rosa Ponselle
 November 16 –  Dino Grandi
 November 23 –  Barry Wood
 November 30 –  Walter Runciman
 December 7 –  John Nance Garner
 December 14 –  James H. Breasted
 December 21 –  Adolf Hitler
 December 28 –  Ki Inukai

1932

 January 4 –  Pierre Laval
 January 11 –  Daniel Willard
 January 18 –  Errett Lobban Cord
 January 25 –  Philip Barry
 February 1 –  Franklin D. Roosevelt
 February 8 –  Hugh S. Gibson
 February 15 –  Nicholas M. Butler
 February 22 –  Yehudi Menuhin
 February 29 –  William Murray
 March 7 –  John Barrymore &  Lionel Barrymore
 March 14 –  Clarence Young
 March 21 –  John A. Simon
 March 28 –  Gabby Street
 April 4 –  Robinson Jeffers
 April 11 –  Éamon de Valera
 April 18 – The Circus
 April 25 –  Neville Chamberlain
 May 2 –  Charles A. Lindbergh Jr.
 May 9 –  Rt. Rev. James Edward Freeman
 May 16 –  Édouard Herriot
 May 23 –  Newton D. Baker
 May 31 –  Eugene Meyer
 June 6 –  Emperor Hirohito
 June 13 –  Walter F. Brown
 June 20 –  Carlos Dávila
 June 27 –  Alfred E. Smith
 July 4 –  Franz von Papen
 July 11 –  Ben Eastman
 July 18 –  Pauline Sabin
 July 25 –   Earl of Bessborough, First lady & page
 August 1 –  Ellsworth Vines
 August 8 –  Norman M. Thomas
 August 15 –  Groucho, Harpo, Chico & Zeppo Marx
 August 22 –  Kurt von Schleicher
 August 29 –  William G. McAdoo
 September 5 –  Yasuya Uchida
 September 12 –  Henry L. Stevens Jr.
 September 19 –  Jacob Ruppert
 September 26 –  Edward Dickinson Duffield
 October 3 –  Huey P. Long
 October 10 –  King George V
 October 17 –   Lily Pons
 October 24 –  Rufus D. Isaacs
 October 31 –  James Farley
 November 7 – Common Citizens
 November 14 –  Howard Jones
 November 21 –  Melvin A. Traylor
 November 28 –  T.E. Lawrence
 December 5 –  Charles Curtis
 December 12 –  Norman H. Davis
 December 19 –  Henry T. Rainey
 December 26 –  Katharine Cornell

1933

 January 2 –  Franklin D. Roosevelt, Man of the Year
 January 9 –  Charles F. Kettering
 January 16 –  Lawrence Tibbett
 January 23 –  Sadao Araki
 January 30 –  Noël Coward
 February 6 –  Carter Glass
 February 13 –  Richard Leigh
 February 20 –  William W. Atterbury
 February 27 –  Pat Harrison
 March 6 –  Sara Delano Roosevelt
 March 13 –  Adolf Hitler
 March 20 –  William H. Woodin
 March 27 –  John Hay Whitney
 April 3 –   Pope Pius XI
 April 10 –  Henry A. Wallace
 April 17 –  Cordell Hull
 April 24 –  Maxim Litvinov
 May 1 –  William R. Hearst
 May 8 –  Raymond Moley
 May 15 –  Gerardo Machado
 May 22 –  Rufus C. Dawes
 May 29 –  Édouard Daladier
 June 5 –  Frank Aydelotte
 June 12 –  Ferdinand Pecora
 June 19 –  Neville Chamberlain
 June 26 –  Italo Balbo
 July 3 –  Hugh S. Johnson
 July 10 –  Joseph Goebbels
 July 17 –  Curtis Bok
 July 24 –  Harold L. Ickes
 July 31 –  Juan Trippe
 August 7 –  Marie Dressler
 August 14 –  Frances Perkins
 August 21 –  Hermann Göring
 August 28 –  Edward J. Kelly
 September 4 –  Jack Crawford
 September 11 –  Gertrude Stein
 September 18 –  George F. Zook
 September 25 –  Engelbert Dollfuss
 October 2 –  John L. Lewis
 October 9 –  George M. Cohan
 October 16 –  Percy S. Straus
 October 23 –  Fiorello LaGuardia,   John P. O'Brien &  Joseph V. McKee
 October 30 –  Maxim Weygand
 November 6 –  George Peek
 November 13 – Football
 November 20 –  Eleanor Roosevelt
 November 27 –  George F. Warren
 December 4 –  Seton Porter
 December 11 –  Chiang Kai-shek
 December 18 –  Eugene Luther Vidal
 December 25 –  Alice in Wonderland (Alec B. Francis & Charlotte Henry)

1934

 January 1 –  Hugh S. Johnson, Man of the Year
 January 8 –  Walter P. Chrysler
 January 15 –  Elmer Thomas &   Charles Coughlin
 January 22 –  Jesse H. Jones
 January 29 –  James Joyce
 February 5 –  James B. Conant
 February 12 –  Kliment Voroshilov
 February 19 –  Harry L. Hopkins
 February 26 –  Richard Whitney
 March 5 –  Puyi
 March 12 –  Gaston Doumergue
 March 19 –  Robert F. Wagner
 March 26 –  George Arliss
 April 2 –  Arturo Toscanini
 April 9 –  Vincent Astor
 April 16 –  Sir Arthur Eddington
 April 23 –  Errett Lobban Cord
 April 30 –  Robert Lee Doughton
 May 7 –  Edward R. Bradley
 May 14 –   Samuel Insull
 May 21 –  Kōki Hirota
 May 28 –  Irving Berlin
 June 4 –  Joseph M. Reeves
 June 11 –  Thomas Mann
 June 18 –  Harold Willis Dodds
 June 25 –  Rexford G. Tugwell
 July 2 –  Riza Shah Pahlevi
 July 9 –  Vernon Gomez
 July 16 –  Paul von Hindenburg
 July 23 –  Joseph B. Poindexter
 July 30 –  James Farley
 August 6 –  Kurt Schmitt
 August 13 –  Elsa Schiaparelli
 August 20 – Cavalcade
 August 27 –  Cecil B. DeMille
 September 3 –  Fred Perry
 September 10 –  Donald Richberg
 September 17 –  Henry Morgenthau
 September 24 –  Louis Barthou
 October 1 –  Henry Noble MacCracken
 October 8 –  Helen Rogers Reid & Friends
 October 15 –  Reverend James Perry
 October 22 –  Upton Sinclair
 October 29 –  Roscoe Turner
 November 5 –  Henry P. Fletcher
 November 12 –  Joseph C. Grew
 November 19 –  Robert M. La Follette, Jr.
 November 26 –  Benjamin N. Cardozo
 December 3 –  Lázaro Cárdenas
 December 10 –  Maxwell Anderson
 December 17 –  White House Staffers (Marguerite LeHand, Louis Howe, Gus Gennerich, Marvin Hunter McIntyre)
 December 24 –  Thomas Hart Benton
 December 31 –  Herbert H. Lehman

1935

 January 7 –  Franklin D. Roosevelt, Man of the Year
 January 14 –  Henry Ford
 January 21 –  John Thomas Taylor
 January 28 –  Kathleen Norris
 February 4 –  Pierre-Étienne Flandin
 February 11 –  Lorne Chabot
 February 18 –  Lotte Lehmann
 February 25 –  Samuel Clay Williams
 March 4 –  Richard B. Harrison
 March 11 –  Frank J. Hogan
 March 18 –  Wang Ching-wei
 March 25 –  General Douglas MacArthur
 April 1 –  Huey P. Long
 April 8 –  Anthony Eden &  Sir John Simon
 April 15 –  Dizzy Dean
 April 22 –  Joseph W. Byrns
 April 29 –  John Francis Neylan
 May 6 –  King George V
 May 13 –  Harry F. Byrd
 May 20 –  Hirosi Saito
 May 27 –  Miriam Hopkins
 June 3 –  John Nance Garner
 June 10 –   Emanuel Libman
 June 17 –  Stanley Baldwin
 June 24 –  Robert M. Hutchins
 July 1 –  John Cowles
 July 8 –  Joseph Lyons
 July 15 –  Joseph T. Robinson
 July 22 –  Joseph P. Kennedy
 July 29 –  Harlow Shapley
 August 5 –  J. Edgar Hoover
 August 12 –  Queen Wilhelmina
 August 19 –  Jean Harlow
 August 26 –  Hugo L. Black
 September 2 –  Donald Budge
 September 9 –  Clyde L. Herring
 September 16 –  Alexis Carrel
 September 23 –  Sir Samuel Hoare
 September 30 –  Cardinal Hayes
 October 7 –  Mickey Cochrane
 October 14 –  Herbert C. Hoover
 October 21 –   John Buchan, 1st Baron Tweedsmuir
 October 28 –  Bruno Mussolini,  Benito Mussolini &  Vittorio Mussolini
 November 4 –  James A. Macauley
 November 11 – Football Spectators
 November 18 –  Mark Sullivan
 November 25 –  Manuel L. Quezon
 December 2 –  Edwin C. Musick
 December 9 –  William Phillips
 December 16 –  Alexei Stakhanov
 December 23 –  Kirsten Flagstad
 December 30 –  Helen Hayes

1936

 January 6 –  Haile Selassie, Man of the Year
 January 13 –  Arthur H. Compton
 January 20 –  J. P. Morgan, Jr.
 January 27 –  Abby Aldrich Rockefeller
 February 3 –  George Santayana
 February 10 –  Marriner S. Eccles
 February 17 –  Leni Riefenstahl
 February 24 –  Hirohito,  Pu Yi,  Joseph Stalin &  Chiang Kai-shek
 March 2 –  Emil Hurja
 March 9 –  Léon Blum
 March 16 –  Martin W. Clement
 March 23 –   Isaiah Bowman
 March 30 –  William Borah
 April 6 –  Daniel W. Hoan
 April 13 –  Adolf Hitler
 April 20 –  Frank N.D. Buchman
 April 27 –  Shirley Temple
 May 4 –   Torkild Rieber
 May 11 –   Franz Boas
 May 18 –  Alfred Landon
 May 25 –  Joseph DeLee
 June 1 –  Pat Harrison
 June 8 –  James V. Allred
 June 15 –  James R. Angell
 June 22 –  French strikers
 June 29 –  Sir Samuel Hoare
 July 6 –  John L. Lewis
 July 13 –  Joe DiMaggio
 July 20 –  Benito Mussolini
 July 27 –  Leroy Miner
 August 3 –  Charles Phelps Taft II
 August 10 –  John Dos Passos
 August 17 –  William L. Clayton
 August 24 –  Francisco Franco,  Emilio Mola &  Manuel Azaña
 August 31 –  Clark Gable
 September 7 –  Eugene Talmadge
 September 14 –  Helen Hull Jacobs
 September 21 –  John D. M. Hamilton
 September 28 –  James B. Conant
 October 5 –  Lou Gehrig &  Carl Hubbell
 October 12 –  Lord Linlithgow
 October 19 –  Eugenio Pacelli
 October 26 –  Thomas Parran, Jr.
 November 2 –  Joseph M. Patterson &  Robert R. McCormick
 November 9 –  Chiang Kai-shek
 November 16 –  Anthony Grzebyk
 November 23 –  Edward F. McGrady
 November 30 –   Marlene Dietrich
 December 7 –  Cordell Hull
 December 14 –  Salvador Dalí
 December 21 –  Edward Johnson
 December 28 –  Emperor Hirohito

1937

 January 4 –  Wallis Warfield Simpson, Woman of the Year
 January 11 –  George Norris
 January 18 –  William S. Knudsen
 January 25 –  Leon Trotsky
 February 1 –  Thomas E. Dewey
 February 8 –  John J. Pelley
 February 15 –  Cardinal Dougherty
 February 22 –  Osman Ali Khan, Asaf Jah VII
 March 1 –  Charles E. Hughes
 March 8 –  King George VI
 March 15 –  Joseph E. Davies & his wife Marjorie Merriweather Post
 March 22 –  Clarence Little
 March 29 –  Clyde Beatty
 April 5 –  Harry B. Housser
 April 12 –  Virginia Woolf
 April 19 –  Bob Feller
 April 26 –  Fulgencio Batista
 May 3 –  Billy and Bobby Mauch
 May 10 –  Matt Winn
 May 17 –  King Christian X
 May 24 –  Cosmo Gordon Lang
 May 31 –  Dionne Quintuplets
 June 7 –  Sidney Howard
 June 14 –  Paul van Zeeland
 June 21 –  Morris Fishbein
 June 28 –  Ethel du Pont &  Franklin D. Roosevelt, Jr.
 July 5 –  George Earle III
 July 12 –  James E. West
 July 19 –   Harry Bridges
 July 26 –  Fumimaro Konoe
 August 2 –  Fiorello LaGuardia
 August 9 –  King Farouk I
 August 16 –  Paul Muni
 August 23 –  Alben Barkley
 August 30 –  Mitsumasa Yonai
 September 6 –  Francisco Franco
 September 13 –  Gottfried von Cramm
 September 20 –  Mitchell Hepburn
 September 27 –  Walter Lippman
 October 4 –  William Green
 October 11 –  William O. Douglas
 October 18 –  Ernest Hemingway
 October 25 –  Wallace Wade
 November 1 –  Ernest O. Lawrence
 November 8 –  Alfred Lunt &   Lynn Fontanne
 November 15 –  Louis Brandeis
 November 22 –  King Leopold III
 November 29 –  William B. Bankhead
 December 6 –  Jean Sibelius
 December 13 –  Colby M. Chester, Chairman of General Foods
 December 20 –  Joseph Stalin
 December 27 –  Walt Disney

1938

 January 3 –  Chiang Kai-shek &  Mme. Chiang, Couple of the Year
 January 10 –  Wesley W. Stout
 January 17 –  Frank Lloyd Wright
 January 24 –  Walter F. White
 January 31 –  Roswell Magill
 February 7 –  John L. Lewis
 February 14 –  Sebastián Pozas Perea
 February 21 –  John G. Bates
 February 28 –  James Roosevelt
 March 7 –  Subhas Chandra Bose
 March 14 –  Dave Kerr
 March 21 –  Kurt von Schuschnigg
 March 28 –  Bette Davis
 April 4 –  Albert Einstein
 April 11 –  Joe Martin
 April 18 –  Lewis Mumford
 April 25 –  Reza Shah Pahlavi
 May 2 –  Claude Pepper
 May 9 –  Orson Welles
 May 16 –  Frank R. McNinch
 May 23 –  Donald W. Douglas
 May 30 –  Earl Browder
 June 6 –  Johnny Goodman
 June 13 –  Charles A. Lindbergh &  Alexis Carrel
 June 20 –  Robert W. Wood
 June 27 –  Edvard Beneš
 July 4 –  Otway H. Chalkley
 July 11 –  Walter Winchell
 July 18 –  Harry L. Hopkins
 July 25 –  Richard Strauss
 August 1 –  Albert B. Chandler
 August 8 –   Frank Capra
 August 15 –  William McChesney Martin, Jr.
 August 22 –  Louis A. Johnson
 August 29 –  Lázaro Cárdenas
 September 5 –  Holger Cahill
 September 12 –  Thomas Corcoran &  Benjamin V. Cohen
 September 19 –  William S. Paley
 September 26 –  Richard Rodgers &  Lorenz Hart
 October 3 –   William L. Bragg
 October 10 –  Sergei Koussevitzky
 October 17 –  Neville Chamberlain
 October 24 –  Sheridan Downey
 October 31 –  Frederick L. Redefer
 November 7 –  André Malraux
 November 14 –  Henry Grady Weaver
 November 21 –  Elmer F. Andrews
 November 28 –   Lord Beaverbrook
 December 5 –  Clifford Odets
 December 12 –  Prince Paul
 December 19 –  Henry A. Wallace
 December 26 – Charlot's 'Nativity'

1939

 January 2 –  Adolf Hitler, Man of the Year
 January 9 –  Oscar Riddle
 January 16 –  Julius P. Heil
 January 23 –  William Faulkner
 January 30 –  Henry E. Sigerist
 February 6 –  Robert Fechner
 February 13 –  Pablo Picasso
 February 20 –  Charles Edison
 February 27 –  Ignace J. Paderewski
 March 6 –  Josef Beck
 March 13 –  William R. Hearst
 March 20 –  John Nance Garner
 March 27 –  Francisco Franco
 April 3 –  Lewis H. Brown
 April 10 –  Ginger Rogers
 April 17 –  Eleanor Roosevelt
 April 24 –  Heinrich Himmler
 May 1 –  Grover A. Whalen
 May 8 –  James Joyce
 May 15 –  George VI
 May 22 –  Nelson Rockefeller
 May 29 –  Glenn L. Martin
 June 5 –  Édouard Daladier
 June 12 –  Dorothy Thompson
 June 19 –  Charles A. Lindbergh
 June 26 –  Sigmund Freud
 July 3 –  Edwin G. Conklin
 July 10 –  Paul V. McNutt
 July 17 –  Sonja Henie
 July 24 –  Edda Ciano
 July 31 –  Wendell L. Willkie
 August 7 –  William Woodward
 August 14 –  Maurice Gamelin
 August 21 –  Eleanor Holm
 August 28 –  Frank Murphy
 September 4 –  Winston Churchill
 September 11 –  Edward Rydz-Śmigły
 September 18 –  Joseph P. Kennedy
 September 25 –  Walther von Brauchitsch
 October 2 –  Arthur Vandenberg
 October 9 –  Queen Elizabeth
 October 16 –  Kaufman T. Keller
 October 23 –  Cyril Newall, 1st Baron Newall
 October 30 –  King Gustav V
 November 6 –  Tom Harmon
 November 13 –  King Carol II
 November 20 –  George S. Kaufman
 November 27 –  Queen Wilhelmina
 December 4 –  Carl Sandburg
 December 11 –  Nelson T. Johnson
 December 18 –  Herbert Hoover
 December 25 –  Vivien Leigh

References

 Time cover search
 Time The Vault

Time magazine (1930s)
1930s
Cover of Time magazine